Craig Storie (born 13 January 1996) is a Scottish professional footballer who last played as a midfielder for Brechin City.

Career

Aberdeen
After spending time with Glasgow Centre, Storie signed as a professional with Aberdeen of the Scottish Premier League in 2012. Before signing with Aberdeen, Storie rejected an offer from Manchester United after Willie Miller convinced Storie that he would get more chances with the first-team at Aberdeen.

Storie made his professional debut for Aberdeen on 27 April 2013, in a league match against Kilmarnock in which he started and played 45 minutes as Aberdeen won the match 1–0.

On 7 November 2013, Storie signed a one-month loan deal with Forfar Athletic.

On 30 January 2015, Storie joined Brechin City on loan for the remainder of the 2014–15 season.

On 3 January 2017, Storie agreed a loan move to St Mirren, starting on 8 January, until the end of the 2016–17 season.

Storie left Aberdeen on 17 January 2018.

Brechin City
In February 2018, Storie signed a short-term contract with Brechin City.

Career statistics

References

External links 

 Aberdeen FC profile

1996 births
Living people
Scottish footballers
Aberdeen F.C. players
Forfar Athletic F.C. players
Brechin City F.C. players
Association football midfielders
Scottish Premier League players
Scottish Professional Football League players
Scotland youth international footballers
Scotland under-21 international footballers
St Mirren F.C. players